The Yangon Stock Exchange (abbreviated YSX) opened on December 2015, at the former Central Bank of Myanmar and Myawaddy Bank headquarters in Yangon. On 23 December 2014, two Japanese firms, Daiwa Institute of Research, the research arm of Daiwa Securities Group and Japan Exchange Group, established a joint venture with the state-owned Myanma Economic Bank to establish this stock exchange. The Securities and Exchange Commission has selected Kanbawza Bank to be YSX' settlement bank.

Building history

The YSX building, located on the corner of Sule Pagoda Road and Merchant Street, formerly housed the Central Bank of Myanmar. The neoclassical structure was designed by G Douglas Smart, and opened in 1939, as the Rangon branch of the Reserve Bank of India, and managed British Burma's financial system, even after its separation from British India in 1937.

Following monetary independence from Britain, the building became home to the Union Bank of Burma (ပြည်တောင်စုဘဏ်), and the first Burmese kyats were issued there in July 1952. It remained the site of Myanmar's central bank until 1993, when it became occupied by the military-owned Myawaddy Bank.

Listed Companies
There are currently 7 companies Listed on the Stock Exchange.

See also
Rangoon Stock Exchange
Myanmar Securities Exchange Centre

References

Economy of Myanmar
Stock exchanges in Asia
Economy of Yangon
Daiwa Securities Group
Japan Exchange Group
Stock exchanges in Southeast Asia
Buildings and structures in Yangon
Buildings and structures completed in 1939